Tatyana Fendrikova (born ) is a volleyball player from Kazakhstan. Multiple owner of the best player in Kazakhstan!

She is a member of the Kazakhstan women's national volleyball team and played for Zhetysu Almaty in 2014. She was part of the Kazakhstani national team at the 2014 FIVB Volleyball Women's World Championship in Italy.  

2016 - Silver medalist of the Asian Cup https://en.m.wikipedia.org/wiki/2016_Asian_Women%27s_Volleyball_Cup  

2016 - Participant of the World Qualifying Tournament for the Olympic Games in Tokyo

2018 FIVB Volleyball Women's World Championship 

2018 - Club World Championship in China https://en.m.wikipedia.org/wiki/2018_FIVB_Volleyball_Women%27s_Club_World_Championship

2018 Asian Games in Jakarta. https://ru.m.wikipedia.org/wiki/%D0%92%D0%BE%D0%BB%D0%B5%D0%B9%D0%B1%D0%BE%D0%BB_%D0%BD%D0%B0_%D0%BB%D0%B5%D1%82%D0%BD%D0%B8%D1%85_%D0%90%D0%B7%D0%B8%D0%B0%D1%82%D1%81%D0%BA%D0%B8%D1%85_%D0%B8%D0%B3%D1%80%D0%B0%D1%85_2018

2019 - Participant in the Qualifying Tournament for the Olympic Games in USA

Clubs
  CSKA, ALMATY, ALTAY

References

1990 births
Living people
People from Talgar
Kazakhstani women's volleyball players
Place of birth missing (living people)
Volleyball players at the 2018 Asian Games
Asian Games competitors for Kazakhstan